Sälen is a locality situated in Malung-Sälen Municipality, Dalarna County, Sweden with 652 inhabitants in 2010.

Despite its small population, Sälen receives many tourists every winter. Sälen is best known for hosting the start of Vasaloppet, the oldest (since 1922) and largest cross country ski race in the world, with over 15,000 participants in the main race alone. It is also known for its many alpine ski resorts, of which there are seven. The oldest resort in Sälen is Högfjällshotellet which was built in 1937 remains popular for recreation, cross country skiing and downhill skiing. Newer resorts with steeper mountains are Hundfjället and Stöten. Other resorts are Lindvallen, Näsfjället, Tandådalen, and Kläppen. Today Lindvallen, Högfjället, Tandådalen and Hundfjället are operated by the Skistar company. Lindvallen and Högfjället are connected with ski lifts, as is Tandådalen with Hundfjället The vertical height is up to 350 m.

Transport
The nearest airport is Scandinavian Mountains Airport, opened in December 2019. Mora Airport is 100 km away (regular bus connections from Mora). The nearest international airport is Oslo Airport, 220 km away.

In the media
Popular rock band U2's music video for the song "New Year's Day" was filmed in Sälen on December 15, 1982.

See also
Scandinavian Mountains Airport
Tourism in Sweden
List of ski areas and resorts in Europe

References

External links
Sälen Tourist Office - Official site
Sälen Resorts
Vasaloppet

Populated places in Dalarna County
Populated places in Malung-Sälen Municipality
Tourism in Sweden
Ski areas and resorts in Sweden